Alexander Paul Weaver (born 3 January 1981) is an English actor and writer, best known for his role as curate Leonard Finch in the ITV series Grantchester (2014-present).

Background
Weaver was born in the Metropolitan Borough of Bolton in Greater Manchester, England. He went to Rivington and Blackrod High School and studied acting at the Guildhall School of Music and Drama.

Career
Weaver's first paid theatre role was in Trevor Nunn's 2004 production of Hamlet, at the Old Vic theatre in London. Weaver played the Prince of Denmark on Monday evenings and at all matinees, whilst Ben Whishaw took on the role for evening performances, from Tuesday to Saturday.

British politician Michael Portillo lauded Weaver's interpretation of Hamlet in The New Statesman: "He [Weaver] gave meaning to the poetry, refusing to be rushed in the soliloquies or intimidated by them, varying volume and pace well. Frame by frame, he made credible Hamlet's progression from self-indulgence to nobility, so we could nearly believe Fortinbras' remark that 'he was likely, had he been put on,/To have proved most royally'."

Weaver has appeared in minor roles in films such as Colour Me Kubrick (2005) (uncredited), The Merchant of Venice (2004), Marie Antoinette (2006), and Unmade Beds (2009); “Me and Orson Welles” (2009 film). he also played "The Kid" in Doom, "Schwob" in Colette, and an uncredited Gulf War soldier in Armistice (2014).

His television credits include D.C. Billy Slaven in The Inspector Lynley Mysteries (episodes "In Pursuit of a Proper Sinner" and "A Cry for Justice") and National Antiquities Museum employee Andy Galbraith in Sherlock episode "The Blind Banker". Weaver has been in Five Days (TV miniseries) as Josh Fairley. He has also been in Five Daughters (TV miniseries) played Tom Alderton . Weaver also has been in Secret State as Josh Leyton. Weaver also appeared in Southcliffe (TV miniseries), where he played Anthony. Weaver was in Life in Squares (TV miniseries) and played Young Leonard Woolf. He was also in The Smoke where he played Tom. Weaver was in The Nativity, in which he played Thomas. Weaver was in Personal Affairs playing Crawford Crawford.

His theatre credits include Meshak in the Royal National Theatre's 2006-07 production of Helen Edmundson's Coram Boy.

Weaver plays fledgling Anglican curate Leonard Finch in the TV series Grantchester (since 2014), assisting the Vicar of Grantchester, Sidney Chambers, and later, Will Davenport.

Radio credits include Bach: The Great Passion, a 2017 biographical radio play by the English writer James Runcie.  Weaver also presents radio shows at a pub called the Boogaloo based in north London. One is called Film And Telly Stuff, which he presents with actor Luke Neal and the other is called The Theme's Of Our Youth, which he presents with actor Jack Whitam.

In September 2017, the BBC announced he had joined the cast of the mini-series PRESS.

He is also known for his role as Rex in the game Xenoblade Chronicles 2 released in December 2017. He reprised the role for the character's appearance in Super Smash Bros. Ultimate, as well as the trailer revealing Pyra and Mythra as playable characters.

In 2019 a fourth series of Grantchester aired, with Weaver reprising his role as Leonard Finch.

In 2020, he stars in a choose-your-own-adventure sci-fi thriller video game The Complex as Dr. Rees Wakefield.

Filmography

Film

Television

Video games

Theatre credits

References

External links
 
 Al Weaver Grantchester PBS Masterpiece

1981 births
Alumni of the Guildhall School of Music and Drama
English male film actors
English male stage actors
English male television actors
Living people
English male Shakespearean actors
Actors from Lancashire
Actors from Bolton